The Kanku-Breakaways Conservation Park, formerly known as The Breakaways Reserve or simply The Breakaways, is a protected area in northern South Australia, just off the Stuart Highway  north of Coober Pedy.

Name and history 
The park got the name "The Breakaways" because the mesas and low hills appear from a distance as if "broken away" from the higher ground of the escarpment. The site is significant for the Antakirinja Matuntjara Yankunytjatjara People, whose name for the area is Umoona, meaning "long life", a name also given to a species of tree found in the area, known as the mulga tree.

The conservation park was renamed as the Kanku-Breakaways Conservation Park on 19 November 2015.

Management
The Breakaways CP is managed under a co-management agreement by the Department of Environment, Water, and Natural Resources in conjunction with the Antakirinja Matu-Yankunytjatjara Aboriginal Corporation and the District Council of Coober Pedy.

Climate 
The semi-arid desert climatic conditions of the park are similar to those of Coober Pedy, with cool nights and very hot days, and summer temperatures can sometimes exceed .

Access and tours 
Access to the main lookout over the site is provided by a  dirt road from the sealed Stuart Highway, or alternatively, via the Dog Fence Scenic Tourist Drive Road. A  circuit can be made by mountain bike from Coober Pedy along the Stuart Highway to the Breakaways, along the dog fence track and returning to Coober Pedy by the Oodnadatta Track.

Tours from Coober Pedy are conducted by several tour operators. Permits for self-guided visits to the area cost A$10 Per Vehicle ($8 Concession) and are available from the Tourist Information Centre in the District Council Office on Hutchinson Street, Coober Pedy.

References

External links
Official webpage
Webpage on the Protected Planet website
THE BREAKAWAYS Conservation Park ( COOBER PEDY - AUSTRALIA ) on YouTube

Conservation parks of South Australia
Protected areas established in 2013
2013 establishments in Australia
Co-managed protected areas in South Australia
Far North (South Australia)